Giselle Patrón (born 9 April 1987 in Lima) is a Peruvian model and actress.

Her mother is from France, and her paternal grandparents were from Italy. She has posed for magazines such as Maxim, SoHo and Cosas Hombre.

For TV, has acted in the series Corazón de fuego.

Beauty contests
 Miss Hawaiian Tropic Perú 2009: Winner
 Miss Hawaiian Tropic 2009: Contestant
 Miss Peru 2011 as Miss Amazonas: Fourth Place
 Miss Bikini International 2011: Runner-up. Winner the title Miss Charming and Miss Fotogénica
 Miss Caraïbes Hibiscus 2011: Winner the title "Miss Captain Oliver's Resort"

Credits

References

External links 

People from Lima
Peruvian female models
Peruvian people of French descent
Peruvian people of Italian descent
21st-century Peruvian actresses
1987 births
Living people
Actresses from Lima
Peruvian stage actresses
Peruvian television actresses
Peruvian beauty pageant winners